Less Talk, More Rock is the second full-length album by the Canadian punk rock band Propagandhi, and the last album to feature bassist John K. Samson. Released in 1996.

Chris Hannah described the album as a conscious decision to be more confrontational, noting the presence of the term "gay-positive" on the album cover. The album was expressly political to weed out the "jocks" and "bros" in the audience.

Track listing

Personnel
Chris Hannah – guitar, vocals
Jord Samolesky – drums, background vocals
John K. Samson – bass, vocals

Cover art
The album cover is the promotional poster of the 1984 Calgary Stampede.

References

External links
 Official lyrics
 Album information at Fat Wreck Chords

1996 albums
Propagandhi albums
Fat Wreck Chords albums
Albums produced by Ryan Greene